Piriya Vidai is a 1975 Indian Tamil-language drama film directed by Srikanth and produced by L. V. Prasad. Starring R. Muthuraman and Prameela, it is a remake of the 1970 Telugu film Thalla? Pellama?.

Plot

Cast 
 R. Muthuraman
 Prameela
V. K. Ramasamy
Thengai Srinivasan
Nagesh
Udaya Chandrika
Vennira Aadai Moorthy
 K. Vijaya
 Vijayachandrika

Production 
Piriya Vidai is a remake of the 1970 Telugu film Thalla? Pellama?, written by N. T. Rama Rao.

Soundtrack 
The soundtrack was composed by G. K. Venkatesh, and lyrics were written by Vaali.

Reception 
Kanthan of Kalki praised the cast performances, but criticised Srikanth's direction. The film failed commercially; Prasad felt this was due to the story "being unsuitable for Tamil audience" and miscasting.

References

External links 
 

1970s Tamil-language films
1975 drama films
Films scored by G. K. Venkatesh
Indian drama films
Tamil remakes of Telugu films